Hooker is a city in Texas County, Oklahoma, United States.  As of the 2010 census, the city population was 1,918.  It is located approximately 20 miles northeast of Guymon on US Route 54 highway.

Toponymy
The city name honors local cattle foreman John “Hooker” Threlkeld, who came to the area in 1873. It has frequently been noted on lists of unusual place names. The city's motto, referring to the alternative interpretation of its name, is "It's a location, not a vocation".

History
In 1902, the Chicago, Rock Island and Pacific Railway laid tracks from Liberal, Kansas southwest through the Hooker area to Texhoma, Texas area.  In 1904, the Chicago Townsite Company oversaw the organization and sale of town lots, and the city quickly grew.  In 1927 the Beaver, Meade and Englewood Railroad (BM&E) built an east–west line to Hooker.

Geography
Hooker is located at  (36.861425, −101.213915).

Climate

Demographics
 

As of the census of 2000, there were 1,788 people, 702 households, and 511 families residing in the city. The population density was 1,960.4 people per square mile (758.6/km). There were 812 housing units at an average density of 890.3/sq mi (344.5/km). The racial makeup of the city was 96.13% White, 0.11% African American, 1.73% Native American, 0.11% Asian, 0.01% from other races, and 1.90% from two or more races. Hispanic or Latino of any race were 14.60% of the population.

There were 702 households, out of which 35.6% had children under the age of 18 living with them, 58.8% were married couples living together, 9.5% had a female householder with no husband present, and 27.1% were non-families. 24.8% of all households were made up of individuals, and 13.0% had someone living alone who was 65 years of age or older. The average household size was 2.54 and the average family size was 3.02.

In the city, the population was spread out, with 28.0% under the age of 18, 8.6% from 18 to 24, 27.2% from 25 to 44, 21.9% from 45 to 64, and 14.3% who were 65 years of age or older. The median age was 36 years. For every 100 females, there were 96.3 males. For every 100 females age 18 and over, there were 92.7 males.

The median income for a household in the city was $34,688, and the median income for a family was $39,113. Males had a median income of $30,694 versus $20,217 for females. The per capita income for the city was $18,086. About 9.1% of families and 10.4% of the population were below the poverty line, including 15.0% of those under age 18 and 5.9% of those age 65 or over.

Government
The Hooker government consists of a mayor and four council members.
 City Hall, 111 S Broadway.

Transportation
US Route 54 and US Route 64 intersect at Hooker.

Hooker Municipal Airport (FAA ID: O45), about 1 mile west, has a 3312’ x 60’ paved runway.

Commercial air transportation is available out of Liberal Mid-America Regional Airport in Kansas, about 21 miles to the northeast.

NRHP Sites

The Hooker Woodframe Grain Elevator off Texas Avenue, as well as the Elmer Baker Barn off Mile 47 Road, are NRHP-listed.

Notable person
 Sandra Giles (1932–2016), actress, raised in Hooker

References

External links

 City of Hooker
 Encyclopedia of Oklahoma History and Culture - Hooker

Cities in Oklahoma
Cities in Texas County, Oklahoma
Oklahoma Panhandle